The Cunas River is a river located in the Junín Region in central Peru. The river originates 5,180 meters above sea level in the Cordillera Occidental. The river spans 3 provinces in the Junín Region: Chupaca Province, Concepción Province and the Huancayo Province.

Course 

The Cunas travels southwest to northeast and enters the Mantaro Valley. The river belongs to the river basin of the Mantaro River.

Economy 

The river passes through the Mantaro Valley which is one of the main suppliers of the city of Lima. The city of Chupaca is the main city along its route.

References

Rivers of Peru
Rivers of Junín Region
Tributaries of the Ucayali River